South Carolina Highway 288 (SC 288) is a  state highway in the U.S. state of South Carolina. The highway connects Pumpkintown and Slater-Marietta.

Route description
SC 288 begins at an intersection with U.S. Route 178 (US 178; Moorefield Memorial Highway) east-northeast of Sunset within Pickens County. It travels to the east-northeast and crosses the Oolenoy River and Mill Creek. Farther to the east is a crossing of Carrick Creek just before entering Pumpkintown. There, it intersects SC 8 (Pumpkintown Highway). Just to the east of town is a crossing of Weaver Creek. Then, the highway crosses over Gowens Creek and curves to the east just before going over the South Saluda River. This river marks the Greenville County. Just before it enters Slater-Marietta, it crosses the Middle Saluda River. Very shortly after entering town, it meets its eastern terminus, an intersection with US 276 (Geer Highway). This intersection is just to the east of Slater Marietta Elementary School and Jimi Turner Park.

Major intersections

See also

References

External links

SC 288 at Virginia Highways' South Carolina Highways Annex

288
Transportation in Pickens County, South Carolina
Transportation in Greenville County, South Carolina